Óscar Daniel Zamora Medinaceli ( 'Motete' , January 20, 1934 – November 17, 2017) was a Bolivian politician and lawyer. A communist student activist in his youth and leader of a failed Maoist insurgency in the 1970s, Zamora Medinaceli went on to become a senator, minister, mayor, ambassador and prefect.

Student activist
Zamora Medinaceli was born in Tarija, and entered politics through activism in the student movement. In 1951 he became the executive secretary of the High School Students Federation of Tarija. Between 1954 and 1958 he served as the executive secretary of the Local University Federation of Tarija. He was also a founder and leader of the Communist Youth of Bolivia. In 1954 he became the founding chairman of the Tarija Civic Youth Committee. He became the executive secretary of the Bolivian University Confederation, a nationwide university students movement. Between 1961 and 1964 he was stationed in Prague, working at the office of the International Union of Students.

Split in the Communist Party
During his tenure in Czechoslovakia, Zamora Medinaceli had developed close links with the Chinese communists. Upon his return to Bolivia, he formed an oppositional tendency inside the Communist Party of Bolivia along with Raúl Ruiz González and Luis Arratia. Zamora Medinaceli's group were expelled from the Communist Party in August 1964 in connection with the second party congress held. His followers founded the pro-Chinese Communist Party of Bolivia (Marxist-Leninist) (PCB(ML)) in 1965, in which Zamora Medinaceli was the main leader.

Che in Bolivia
Zamora Medinaceli had contacts with Che Guevara and Régis Debray during the 1960s. Zamora Medinaceli had been part of the CODEP delegation (which also included Guillermo Lora and Lidia Gueiler Tejada) to the Latin American Solidarity Organization in Havana in January 1966, but which was expelled from Cuba. Nevertheless, contacts between Zamora Medinaceli and the Cubans continued. In the end PCB(ML) never offered any concrete support to Guevara's guerrilla effort. Zamora Medinaceli did however continue to defend Guevara's guerrilla struggle publicly. Zamora Medinaceli is harshly criticized by Fidel Castro in his preface to Guevara's Bolivian Diaries. The refusal of Zamora Medinaceli to support Guevara's initiative in 1967 remained a bone of contention between Maoists and Guevarists in Latin America for several years to come. Zamora Medinaceli wrote a lengthy rebuttal to Castro in 1968, in which he stated that Guevara himself had not accused the PCB(ML) of betrayal, that PCB(ML) had discussed plans for an armed insurrection during a visit to Cuba in 1964, that the PCB(ML) had been unaware of Guevara's arrival in Bolivia and that Castro had aligned himself with the 'revisionists' during the 1964 Latin American conference of Communist Parties.

UCAPO insurgency
Under the code-name 'Comandante Rolando' he led the irregular rebel group Poor Peasants Union (UCAPO), which began militant actions in the Santa Cruz region in 1970. UCAPO was able to integrate some structures of the National Liberation Army and regroup some of its members. Zamora Medinaceli was however captured, along with three other UCAPO militants, by Rangers following the seizure by UCAPO of the Chané ranch in 1970. The arsenal of the captured group included two revolvers and some Mao Zedong pamphlets. Zamora Medinaceli's capture was a severe blow for the underground PCB(ML). Soon after being detained, he was summarily deported to Argentina. He did however return to the country soon afterwards. In response to the failures of the UCAPO rebellion, Zamora Medinaceli later declared himself to be a 'social democrat' and a supporter of parliamentarism.

Parliamentarian and Revolutionary Left Front leader
He later became the founding chairman of the Revolutionary Left Front (FRI). He was elected to the Senate of Bolivia several times; in 1979, 1982, 1989 and 1997 (during the latter period, his alternate was Raymundo Asseff Goméz). From 1986 to 1987 he served as the President of the Senate of Bolivia. He served as mayor of Tarija 1987 to 1989, 1994 to 1996 and 1996 to 1997. He was the Bolivian Minister of Labour between 1989 and 1992.

In the 1993 presidential election Zamora Medinaceli was the vice-presidential candidate of Hugo Banzer. Zamora Medinaceli's candidature did raise some eyebrows, not the least since it was under Banzer's command that he had gotten deported from the country during the UCAPO rebellion.

Zamora Medinaceli was candidate for mayor of Tarija in the 1999 municipal elections, and finished in third place with 16.64% of the votes.

Later political career
Zamora Medinaceli was appointed Bolivian ambassador to China, but renounced his position in order to return to political life in Bolivia and stand as a candidate in the 2002 elections. During the early 2000s, he served as prefect of the Tarija Department for a period. He was elected to the Senate in 2002.

He was again candidate for mayor of Tarija in the 2004 municipal elections. Zamora Medinaceli finished second, with 13.8% of the votes.

In September 2005 he was elected head of the Tarija Parliamentarian Brigade.

He was elected to the Bolivian Constituent Assembly in 2006.

In September 2007 he suffered an emboli, and was forced to leave the Constituent Assembly.

Family
Zamora Medinaceli is the uncle of the Bolivian politician Jaime Paz Zamora. Zamora Medinaceli had played an important role in shaping the political views of his nephew, for example he arranged for Paz Zamora to stay in Albania for six months during his university period in Europe. When Paz Zamora became president, he appointed Zamora Medinaceli as Minister of Labour.

Death
Zamora Medinaceli suffered a stroke in August 2017, and remained in a coma for two months. The Senate of Bolivia paid tribute to him in September 2017. He died on November 17, 2017, in his home city of Tarija. The government of Tarija announced a 90-day mourning period after the news of his death broke. President Evo Morales expressed his condolences.

References

External links

1934 births
2017 deaths
Ambassadors of Bolivia to China
Labor ministers
Mayors of places in Bolivia
20th-century Bolivian lawyers
Presidents of the Senate of Bolivia
Revolutionary Left Front (Bolivia) politicians
Communist Party of Bolivia (Marxist–Leninist) politicians
Anti-revisionists
Communist Party of Bolivia politicians
Members of the Senate of Bolivia
People from Tarija